Luis Rodríguez Vaz (born 7 February 1942) is a Spanish football manager.

Manager career
Born in Verín, Ourense, Galicia, Rodríguez Vaz was appointed Deportivo de La Coruña in November 1981, after a spell at Racing de Ferrol. In 1987, he returned to Dépor, but was sacked in February of the following year.

In December 1992 Rodríguez Vaz was named CD Lugo manager, with the side struggling in Segunda División. However, after only winning five matches out of 24, he suffered team relegation.

In June 1997, after another spell at Racing, Rodríguez Vaz was appointed at the helm of CD Ourense, narrowly avoiding the drop in the last matchday. He left the club in June 1998, but eventually returned in December.

On 19 November 2001 Rodríguez Vaz was again appointed at the Rojillos, being relieved from his duties at the end of the campaign. He was also manager of SD Compostela, CD As Pontes and G.D. Chaves.

References

External links

1942 births
Living people
Sportspeople from the Province of Ourense
Spanish football managers
Segunda División managers
Segunda División B managers
Tercera División managers
SD Compostela managers
Racing de Ferrol managers
Deportivo de La Coruña managers
CD Lugo managers
G.D. Chaves managers
Spanish expatriate football managers
Spanish expatriate sportspeople in Portugal